Turkiska SK is a Swedish football club located in Spånga / Stockholm.

Background
Turkiska SK currently plays in Division 6 Stockholm which is the sixth tier of Swedish football. They play their home matches at the Spånga IP in Spånga.

The club is affiliated to Stockholms Fotbollförbund.

Season to season

Footnotes

External links
 Turkiska SK – Official website

Football clubs in Stockholm
Turkish association football clubs outside Turkey
Diaspora football clubs in Sweden